Hubert Sobol (born 25 June 2000) is a Polish professional footballer who plays as a forward for I liga side Górnik Łęczna, on loan from Wisła Kraków.

Career
In June 2019, it was confirmed that Sobol would spend one more season out on loan, this time at Odra Opole for the whole 2019-20 season.

References

External links

2000 births
Living people
Polish footballers
Association football forwards
Lech Poznań II players
Lech Poznań players
Warta Poznań players
Odra Opole players
Wisła Kraków players
OKS Stomil Olsztyn players
Górnik Łęczna players
Ekstraklasa players
I liga players
II liga players
III liga players
Poland youth international footballers